The Moonachie Public Schools is a community public school district that serves students in pre-kindergarten through eighth grade from Moonachie, in Bergen County, New Jersey, United States.

As of the 2018–19 school year, the district, comprising one school, had an enrollment of 317 students and 30.7 classroom teachers (on an FTE basis), for a student–teacher ratio of 10.3:1.

The district is classified by the New Jersey Department of Education as being in District Factor Group "B", the second lowest of eight groupings. District Factor Groups organize districts statewide to allow comparison by common socioeconomic characteristics of the local districts. From lowest socioeconomic status to highest, the categories are A, B, CD, DE, FG, GH, I and J.

For ninth through twelfth grades, approximately 100 public school students attend Wood-Ridge High School in Wood-Ridge, as part of a sending/receiving relationship with the Wood-Ridge School District. As of the 2018–19 school year, the high school had an enrollment of 583 students and 46.9 classroom teachers (on an FTE basis), for a student–teacher ratio of 12.4:1.

Schools
Students in PreK-8 attend the Robert L. Craig School which served 310 students (based on 2018–19 enrollment data from the National Center for Education Statistics).

Administration
Core members of the district's administration are:
Mr. James S. Knipper, Superintendent / Principal
Laurel Spadavecchia, Business Administrator / Board Secretary
Dana Genatt, Director of Curriculum & Instruction

Board of education
The district's board of education, with five members, sets policy and oversees the fiscal and educational operation of the district through its administration. As a Type II school district, the board's trustees are elected directly by voters to serve three-year terms of office on a staggered basis, with either one or two seats up for election each year held (since 2012) as part of the November general election.

References

External links
Robert L. Craig School

School Data for the Moonachie School District, National Center for Education Statistics

Moonachie, New Jersey
New Jersey District Factor Group B
School districts in Bergen County, New Jersey